Moominvalley is a fictional place, where the Moomins live in the tales by Finnish author Tove Jansson.

Especially in the early books Moominvalley is depicted as a beautiful place with green slopes, rivers, fruit trees, flowers and a place for calm and peaceful life as in the tradition of pastoral poetry, and yet it is still threatened by natural forces such as flooding and volcanoes. The valley is surrounded by Lonely Mountains in the east and by other mountains in the south, while the west faces the sea. Thus, travel on land is often preceded by mountain climbing in the stories. It was inspired by Ängsmarn, a family retreat in Sweden, which is also situated on a grassy field facing the sea and surrounded by rocky outcrops. The Moominvalley is also a manifestation of Jansson's escapism; she often fantasized about establishing a colony in Morocco or moving to The Basque Country or Tonga.

In Moominpappa at Sea, Moominvalley is depicted as a place of boredom.

Moominvalley appears to be above the Arctic Circle, based on the description in Moominland Midwinter of the sun not rising in winter.

Moominvalley is also the former name for the Moomin Museum in Tampere, Finland.

References

Bibliography 
 

Fictional elements introduced in 1945
Fictional valleys
Moomin locations